The Drohman Cabin is a one and a half story log cabin built about 1850 in Madison, Wisconsin, United States. The main structure was made of hand-hewn oak logs joined by German-style dovetail joints. Interior walls are wattle-and-daub, which is unusual in Wisconsin. It was listed on the National Register of Historic Places in 1981. In 1989, it was moved near the Wisconsin River and Helena, Wisconsin in Iowa County.

References

Houses on the National Register of Historic Places in Wisconsin
Log buildings and structures on the National Register of Historic Places in Wisconsin
National Register of Historic Places in Iowa County, Wisconsin
Houses in Iowa County, Wisconsin